Alessandra Martines (born 19 September 1963) is an Italian-French dancer and actress mainly working in the English, French and Italian speaking-worlds. She started young in ballet on opera stages in Switzerland, France, the United States and then Italy before becoming a lead on television for RAI captured ballets and entertainment shows (the Italian national public broadcasting) in the eighties.

She is primarily known for portraying the main role in the cult Fantaghirò series, consisting of five films (1991-1996) still regularly re-run across Europe as of 2020, and for her work in auteur productions such as nine films by Claude Lelouch to whom she was married until 2009.

In 2008, she was made Knight of the Ordre national du Mérite awarded by the President of the French Republic. She received the lifetime achievement Kineo Award at the 71st Venice International Film Festival in 2014.

Early life
Second cousin of Carla Bruni and Valeria Bruni Tedeschi, she moved to France with her family at the age of five. As a teenager, she enrolled at the Conservatoire de Paris where she studied solfeggio, history and theory of dance and classical music and dance.

Career
Martines debuted at a young age as a dancer at the Zurich Opera House in 1972. After some time working in the United States, including the Chicago City Ballet, she moved to Rome where she worked at the Teatro dell'Opera. In 1985 she began her collaboration with RAI, with the lunchtime chat / quiz show Pronto, chi gioca?; she later gained great popularity with the Saturday Night shows Fantastico and Europa Europa, and then for her portrayal of Princess Fantaghirò in the Fantaghirò series.

In cinema, she is best known for her interpretations under the direction of her ex-husband, the French director Claude Lelouch, in several film including Les Misérables and And now... Ladies and Gentlemen. She also starred on stage, most notably in L'appartamento by Franca Valeri.

Personal life
Martines has a daughter with Claude Lelouch to whom she was married between 1995–2009. In 2012, at the age of 49, she had a son with her partner Cyril Descours.

Stage

Dancer

Theatre

Filmography

Cinema

Television

Presenter or Jury Member

References

External links

1963 births
Living people
Actresses from Rome
Italian film actresses
Italian female dancers
French film actresses
Italian emigrants to France
Italian television personalities
Knights of the Ordre national du Mérite
Italian stage actresses
French stage actresses
Musicians from Rome
Italian television actresses
French television actresses
20th-century Italian actresses
21st-century Italian actresses
20th-century French actresses
21st-century French actresses